EML Admiral Cowan (M313) is a Sandown-class minehunter. Formerly HMS Sandown, lead ship of her class of the Royal Navy, she is now an Estonian Navy ship. Renamed EML Admiral Cowan, she is the flagship of the Estonian Navy and part of the Estonian Navy's mine sweeping flotilla. Admiral Cowan is the lead vessel of the Estonian Navy Mineships Division and also the first of the three modernised Sandown class minehunters received.

History
HMS Sandown was built by Vosper Thornycroft and was laid down at their Woolston, Southampton shipyard on 2 February 1987 and was launched on 18 April 1988 by the Duchess of Gloucester, as the lead ship of the 12-ship class of Sandown class minehunters. Sandown entered service a year later on 9 June 1989.

After commissioning, Sandown carried out an extensive programme of trials, and was not fully operational until December 1992, having suffered problems with her sonar outfit. She participated in a number of operations in support of the British fleet, including operating as part of a NATO-led operation between 12 June - 26 August 1999, along with the Hunt class Mine countermeasure vessel  and the survey ship . The operation was intended to clear the Adriatic of bombs jettisoned during the Kosovo campaign. Together Sandown and Atherstone accounted for about 20% of the 93 bombs and missiles that were located and destroyed.

On 16 January 2000 Sandown located the wreck of the sunken scallop dredger, the Solway Harvester. Sandown spent July 2002 on a Joint Maritime Course, after which she deployed to the Mediterranean to take part in the Argonaut 02 exercises, which lasted until Christmas. Sandown was also deployed as part of Operation Telic, to clear mines in the Persian Gulf, and sweep passages into Iraqi ports.

After refitting in Rosyth, Sandown was formally handed over to the Estonian Navy in April 2007. Her new name comes from Admiral Sir Walter Henry Cowan who led the British naval forces in the Baltic in their intervention in the Russian Civil War, providing naval support to Estonia during the Estonian War of Independence.

Between July and December 2018, the ship went through a modernization programme at Babcock's Rosyth facilities. It was fitted with the Thales Sonar 2193 navigation system and Thales M-CUBE command and control system. Its composite hull and electrical systems received repairs and upgrades. Her sister ships  and  will also be modernized for a total cost of around 30 million euros.

Crest
The vessel's crest was presented by Queen Elizabeth II on 20 October 2006 in Tallinn.
The crest is a red saltire cross on a silver shield and above, a red fleur de lys (lily). The shield is placed into a blue ring which is surrounded by a golden ship's rope. The ship's crest is based on Walter Cowan's family arms. The ship's motto in Latin is: Ad Omnia Paratus - which in English means: "Prepared for Anything". The crest was designed by Priit Herodes.

See also
BALTRON project
Mineships Division

Notes

References

External links

Estonian Navy
Navy News
Shipping News
Photographs of Sandown in Operation Telic

Sandown-class minehunters of the Estonian Navy
Ships built in Southampton
1988 ships
Estonian Mineships Division
Minehunters of Estonia